= List of Hungarian women's biographies =

List of biographies of women published in Hungarian

This is a list of biographies of women published in the Hungarian language. It documents biographical works ranging from historical portraits of Hungarian queens to contemporary lexicons of famous women.

Author	Title	Place of Publication, Publisher	Year	Electronic Access
Gustáv Remellay	Our Ladies of the Past	Pest, Ráth Mór Publishing	1860	
Benő Nagy – Elek Sárváry	Biographies of Hungarian Women	Debrecen, Csáthy & Co.	1861	Google Books
Mihály Zsihovics	Hungarian Women. Historical Portraits	Pest, Gusztáv Heckenast	1871	
Sándor Endrődi	Biographies of Hungarian Women	Pozsony, Károly Stampfel	1889	
Kayserling Meyer	Jewish Women in History, Literature, and Art	Budapest, Révai Testvérek	1883	
Jenő Kemechey	Great Women of Hungary	Budapest, Singer & Wolfner	1902	
Sándor Juhász	Protestant Women	Gyoma, Izidor Kner Printing House	1903	
Emőd Farkas	Great Women of Hungary (3 vols)	Budapest, Lampel Róbert	1911	
?	Lives of Great Women	Budapest, Singer & Wolfner	1912?	
Sándor Takáts	Old Hungarian Women	Budapest, "Élet" Publishing	1914	
Sándor Takáts	Great Hungarian Women (2 vols)	Budapest, Genius Publishing	1926–1934	
Margit Bozzay	Lexicon of Hungarian Women	Budapest, Dr. Sándor Dajkovich	1931	MEK
Multiple authors	A Thousand Years of Great Women	Budapest, Dante Publishing	1930s	MTDA
Ilona Pálfy	Women for Hungarian Independence	Budapest, Művelt Nép Publishing	1952	
Zoltán Halász	Queens – Queen Consorts	Budapest, Minerva Publishing	1990	
Géza Sallér	Famous Women at the Pinnacle of Suffering	Budapest, Self-published	1992	
Jolán Veresegyháziné Kovács	Mini-Lexicon of Famous Women	Budapest, Anno Publishing	1990s	
Ferenc Mitták	Famous Women in Hungarian History	Debrecen, Tóth Bookstore	1990s	
Károly Szerencsés – János Estók	Famous Women in Hungarian History	Budapest, Kossuth Publishing	2007	
Joyce Tyldesley	Chronicle of Egyptian Queens	Budapest, Móra Ferenc Youth Publishing	2008	

== Sources ==
- Petrik Géza: Jegyzéke az 1860–1875. években megjelent magyar könyvek- és folyóiratoknak, Budapest, 1888–1892.
- Petrik Géza: Magyar Könyvészet 1886–1900. I–II., Budapest, 1913.
- Petrik Géza – Barcza Imre: Az 1901–1910. években megjelent magyar könyvek, Budapest, 1917–1928.
- Kozocsa Sándor: Magyar Könyvészet 1911–1920 (I–II.), Budapest, 1939–1942.
- Antikvarium.hu, Arcanum.hu, and Bookline.hu databases.
